Litoria biakensis is a species of frog in the subfamily Pelodryadinae. It is endemic to Indonesia. This species has been found in two localities on the island of Biak, 120 km off the north-western coast of New Guinea, in Papua Province, Indonesia.

References

 Menzies and Tyler, 2004  Litoria biakensis.   2006 IUCN Red List of Threatened Species.   Downloaded on 20 July 2012.

Litoria
Amphibians described in 2006
Amphibians of Indonesia